Tomé Rodrigues Mendes (born 10 June 1986), known as Tomé, is a Portuguese professional footballer who plays for AD Castro Daire as a defender.

Club career
He made his professional debut in the Segunda Liga for União da Madeira on 4 September 2011 in a game against Penafiel.

References

External links

1986 births
People from Viseu
Living people
Portuguese footballers
Académico de Viseu F.C. players
C.D. Tondela players
C.F. União players
Liga Portugal 2 players
Association football defenders
Sportspeople from Viseu District